Lycée Français d'Agadir (LFA, Tifinagh: ⴰⵙⵉⵏⴰⵏ ⴰⴼⵔⴰⵏⵙⵉⵙ ⵖ ⴰⴳⴰⴷⵉⵔ) is a French international school located in the Quartier Founty-Bensergao in Agadir, Morocco. It serves maternelle (preschool) until lycée (senior high school).

On 31 August 2014 the Groupe scolaire Paul Gauguin closed, and students were moved to the LFA.

References

External links
 Lycée Français d'Agadir
 http://www.lyceefrancaisagadir.org/wp-content/uploads/2013/02/CR-r%C3%A9union-2-f%C3%A9vrier-Agadir.pdf- 

Agadir
French international schools in Morocco

fr:Lycée français d'Agadir